Hammil is an unincorporated community in Mono County, California.

The Hammil brothers (William, Hugh, and Robert) homesteaded at the site in 1870. The Carson and Colorado Railroad arrived in 1883 and named the settlement after them. Hammil's postal service was handled by the Mocalno, which operated from 1915 to 1937. Mocalno was named by adding "cal" for California in the Mono (the county's name).

References

Unincorporated communities in California
Unincorporated communities in Mono County, California